Too Young for Ghosts is a play by Janis Balodis. Probing two points of contact between European migrants and northern Queensland, the play entwines the experience of Latvian migrants in 1948 and the expeditions of Ludwig Leichhardt in 1845. It was produced by both the Melbourne Theatre Company and Sydney Theatre Company in 1985, with subsequent productions in Brisbane in 1988 and Perth in 1991.

Awards and nominations

References

External links 

Australian plays
1985 plays